The President Sergio Osmeña Sr. Highway (often shortened as Osmeña Highway), also known as the South Superhighway, is a  major highway that links Quirino Avenue in Paco, Manila to Epifanio de los Santos Avenue (EDSA) and South Luzon Expressway (SLEX) at the Magallanes Interchange in Makati. 

The highway is designated as a component of National Route 145 (N145) of the Philippine highway network and of Radial Road 3 (R-3) of Metro Manila's arterial road network.

The highway is named after Sergio Osmeña, the 4th President of the Philippines. In addition, its name is also alternatively applied on South Luzon Expressway's section from Magallanes Interchange to Alabang Interchange in Muntinlupa.

Route description 

The Highway starts at a traffic light intersection with Quirino Avenue in Paco, Manila. It traverses the districts of Malate and San Andres Bukid and crosses San Andres Street, Ocampo (Vito Cruz) Street, and Zobel Roxas Street. It then enters the city of Makati and climbs over to pass above Gil Puyat Avenue through the Osmeña Flyover (also known as Buendia Flyover), with service roads to serve that avenue and several side streets. The first stage of the elevated Skyway starts on the ramps past the flyover. Osmeña Highway crosses Arnaiz Avenue and soon crosses over EDSA at the Magallanes Interchange, where the highway continues south as the South Luzon Expressway. Most of the highway parallels the PNR Metro South Commuter Line and runs under Skyway.

The Paco–Muntinlupa segment of the Sucat–Paco–Araneta–Balintawak transmission line of National Grid Corporation of the Philippines (NGCP) uses the highway right of way from Quirino Avenue to Magallanes Interchange.

Road maintenance

The entire highway is classified as a national secondary road and is maintained by the Department of Public Works and Highways (DPWH) through the South Manila District Engineering Office and Metro Manila 2nd District Engineering Office in Manila and Makati, respectively. The Metropolitan Manila Development Authority (MMDA) has jurisdiction also of both the tolled and non-tolled segments, and maintains motorcycle lanes up to Sales Interchange (Nichols). It also handles the traffic management, alongside the local governments of Manila and Makati.

Apparently, Skyway Operations and Maintenance Corporation (SOMCO), the operator of Skyway and a subsidiary of San Miguel Corporation, wanted Osmeña Highway to be under its control, given that the highway runs below Skyway. SOMCO and SMC Tollways consider the highway's section from Buendia to Magallanes as part of Skyway At-Grade as it runs beneath Skyway Stage 1.  However, it was stated that SOMCO and Citra Metro Manila Tollways Corporation (now SMC Skyway Corporation), the concession holder of Skyway Stage 1, do not have jurisdiction over toll-free roads, including Osmeña Highway.

Name 

South Superhighway is the older name of the highway and is more widely used alternatively up to date. It is also the former and alternative name of the tolled South Luzon Expressway. It was also known as and forms part of Manila South Diversion Road or simply as South Diversion Road.

The highway was renamed to President Sergio Osmeña Sr. Highway (often shortened as Osmeña Highway), after the Commonwealth President Sergio Osmeña, by virtue of Republic Act No. 6760 in 1989. The name also refers alternatively to the segment of the tolled South Luzon Expressway from Magallanes Interchange to Kilometer 28.387 in San Pedro, Laguna. It was also applied further south to Calamba, Laguna until 1992, when this segment was renamed after Dr. José Rizal by virtue of Republic Act No. 7625.

History 

The highway was originally built apparently in the 1960s as part of the newer road connecting Manila and Southern Luzon, called Manila South Diversion Road or South Superhighway. It was built in parallel to the Philippine National Railway's Batangas extension line and over the old Hernandez Street in San Andres, Manila. The flyover that crosses above Buendia Avenue was later added on the highway, built in 1979.

The highway was renamed in 1989 to President Sergio Osmeña Sr. Highway by virtue of Republic Act No. 6760. The center island of Osmeña Highway's section from Zobel Roxas to EDSA underwent repairs by the then-municipal government of Makati in 1994. The highway was also involved in the construction of Skyway Stage 1, which is built above its section south of Buendia, from 1995 to 1998. The Osmeña Flyover underwent repairs in 2011. The highway would once again become involved in another Skyway construction, this time Skyway Stage 3 that commenced in 2014. With this, the Makati–Manila boundary marker that once stood on the highway was demolished on October 24, 2014.

Transportation
Osmeña Highway is accessed through jeepneys, taxis, and buses. Running parallel to the PNR Metro South Commuter Line, the highway is served by Philippine National Railway (PNR) stations namely: San Andres, Vito Cruz, Dela Rosa (replacing Buendia), Pasay Road, and EDSA (interchange to MRT Line 3 at Magallanes station).

Intersections

References 

Streets in Metro Manila
Limited-access roads in the Philippines